The Franklin Avenue station was a station on the demolished section of the BMT Myrtle Avenue Line. The station was located at the intersection of Myrtle and Franklin Avenues in Bedford-Stuyvesant, Brooklyn, New York, United States. The station opened in 1889, and closed in 1969.

History
The Myrtle Avenue Elevated was constructed by the Union Elevated Railroad Company, which was leased to the Brooklyn Elevated Railroad for its operation. The initial section of the line opened on April 10, 1888, running over Myrtle Avenue from Johnson and Adams Streets to a junction with what was then known as the Main Line at Grand Avenue. Trains continued along Grand Avenue and Lexington Avenue to Broadway, where the line joined the Broadway Elevated, and then along Broadway to East New York. On April 27, 1889, the line was extended east along Myrtle Avenue to Broadway,  including a station at Franklin Avenue.

On October 4, 1969, the section of the Myrtle Avenue Elevated between Broadway and Jay Street, including Franklin Avenue station, was closed and was demolished soon after.

Station layout
The elevated station had two tracks and one island platform. The station platform was wooden, and a canopy covered the eastern end of the platform. The station house was located at the eastern end of the station, and staircases led to the eastern corners of Franklin Avenue and Myrtle Avenue.

References

External links

Defunct BMT Myrtle Avenue Line stations
Railway stations in the United States opened in 1889
Railway stations closed in 1969
1889 establishments in New York (state)
1969 disestablishments in New York (state)
Former elevated and subway stations in Brooklyn